The Christchurch Cougars were a New Zealand basketball team based in Christchurch. The Cougars competed in the National Basketball League (NBL) and played their home games at Cowles Stadium. The Cougars pulled out of the NBL in 2011 after just two seasons following the Christchurch earthquake.

Team history
In December 2008, in the wake of the Canterbury Rams withdrawing from the NBL, the Christchurch Cougars were established by Christchurch basketball couple Amy and Andrew Gardiner.

Andrew Gardiner, a former Tall Black and long-serving national league player who finished his career with Canterbury, was immediately named the Cougars' head coach. The team recruited well with guards Paul Henare and Paora Winitana, and imports Tim Behrendorff and Trenton Wurtz. In their inaugural season, the Cougars finished fourth with a 10–6 record. After winning their quarter-final match-up against the Harbour Heat, they were defeated in the semi-finals by the Waikato Pistons. While Henare was the assist champion in 2009, Behrendorff was named to the All-Star Five. In 2010, the Cougars brought back Jeremy Kench to Christchurch and picked up Aidan Daly, but they failed to make the playoffs as they finished seventh with a 9–9 record.

Following the 2010 season, the Cougars ran into financial issues. In January 2011, the team was kicked out of Cowles Stadium due to unpaid debt to the city council. The Gardiners intended to move their team to a new stadium just being finished in Lincoln on the outskirts of the city. However, following the Christchurch earthquake, the Cougars were forced to withdraw from the NBL in March 2011. Last-gasp meetings by Amy and Andrew Gardiner attempted to stitch together a rescue package to save the Cougars, but ultimately the level of financial risk was too great.

In April 2013, the Cougars were rumoured to be ready to re-enter the NBL within two years. This did not eventuate, and in November 2013, the Canterbury Rams were granted re-entry into the league thanks to the efforts of Christchurch businessman Andrew Harrison.

References

Basketball teams in New Zealand
National Basketball League (New Zealand) teams
Sport in Christchurch
Basketball teams established in 2008
2008 establishments in New Zealand
2011 disestablishments in New Zealand
Basketball teams disestablished in 2011